Meet the Baron is a 1933 American pre-Code comedy film starring Jack Pearl, Jimmy Durante, Edna May Oliver, ZaSu Pitts, Ted Healy and His Stooges (Moe Howard, Larry Fine and Curly Howard). The title of the film refers to Pearl's character of Baron Munchhausen, which he made famous on his radio show.

Plot
A couple of bunglers (Jimmy Durante and Jack Pearl) are abandoned in the jungles of Africa by Baron Munchausen. A rescue team mistake Pearl for the missing Baron, and take the two of them back to America where they receive a hero's welcome.

The phony Baron is invited to speak at Cuddle College, run by Dean Primrose (Edna May Oliver). There he falls for ZaSu Pitts and meets three crazy janitors (The Three Stooges), and faces exposure as a fraud.

Cast
Jack Pearl as The Famous Baron Munchausen of the Air
Jimmy Durante as Joe McGoo – the Favorite "Schnozzle" of the Screen
ZaSu Pitts as Zasu, Upstairs Maid
Ted Healy as Head Janitor
Edna May Oliver as Dean Primrose
The Metro-Goldwyn-Mayer Girls as Dancers
Henry Kolker as Baron Munchausen
William B. Davidson as General Broadcasting Representative
Moe Howard as Janitor
Larry Fine as Janitor
Jerry Howard as Janitor
Ben Bard as Charley Montague
 Claude King as Explorer

Reception
The film was a box-office disappointment for MGM.

"Clean as a Whistle", a musical number risqué for its time which involves a group of women in a shower, was later featured in the 1994 MGM retrospective That's Entertainment! III as an example of Pre-Code Hollywood.

See also
The Three Stooges filmography

References

External links
 
 
 Meet the Baron at ThreeStooges.net
 
 

1933 films
1933 comedy films
American slapstick comedy films
American black-and-white films
Metro-Goldwyn-Mayer films
Films with screenplays by Herman J. Mankiewicz
The Three Stooges films
Films produced by David O. Selznick
Baron Munchausen
Films directed by Walter Lang
1930s English-language films
1930s American films